Markdeh is a village in Zarrin Rural District of Zayandehrud District, Saman County, Chaharmahal and Bakhtiari province, Iran. At the 2006 census, its population was 1,348 in 392 households. The following census in 2011 counted 1,528 people in 487 households. The latest census in 2016 showed a population of 1,601 people in 520 households; it was the largest village in its rural district.

References 

Saman County

Populated places in Chaharmahal and Bakhtiari Province

Populated places in Saman County

fa:مارکده